The Milwaukee Brewers' 2009 season was the 40th season for the franchise in Milwaukee and 41st overall. It was Ken Macha's first season as manager of the team. The Brewers failed to improve on their 90–72 record of a year ago and missed the post season, finishing with a losing record of 80–82.

Offseason moves

Pitchers
Starting pitchers CC Sabathia, who was acquired from the Cleveland Indians in a mid-season trade in 2008, and Ben Sheets both rejected arbitration and became free agents following the end of the 2008 season. Numerous teams showed interest in Sabathia, considered one of the best free agent pitchers available after compiling an 11–2 record and an ERA of only 1.62 in 17 starts for the Brewers in 2008. The Brewers made a 5-year, $100 million contract offer to Sabathia, but he elected to sign with the New York Yankees on December 9, receiving a 7-year, $161 million contract that was the largest received by a pitcher at the time. No serious attempt was made to resign Sheets, who had been the Brewers' ace before the acquisition of Sabathia but struggled with numerous injuries throughout his career.

In the bullpen, closer Salomón Torres elected to retire from baseball despite believing that it would have been "a given" that the Brewers would exercise their 2009 contract option on him. After a disappointing 2008 season, former closer Éric Gagné was not offered arbitration. Left-handed specialist Brian Shouse was offered arbitration, but instead chose to sign with the Tampa Bay Rays. No attempt was made to resign Guillermo Mota, who eventually signed with the Los Angeles Dodgers.

Needing to acquire at least one starter to fill the hole in the rotation left by Sabathia and Sheets, the Brewers signed free agent Braden Looper, formerly of the St. Louis Cardinals, to a one-year, $4.5 million contract for 2009. To replace the retired Torres, the Brewers turned to all-time saves leader Trevor Hoffman, who became available after contentious contract negotiations caused the San Diego Padres, Hoffman's home for 16 years, to pull back their 2009 contract offer. Hoffman was signed to a one-year, $6 million contract for the Brewers. Relievers Todd Coffey, who was signed to a one-year contract avoiding arbitration after being claimed off waivers in September, and free agent Jorge Julio rounded out the offseason bullpen acquisitions.

Position players

Outfielder Gabe Kapler, second baseman Ray Durham, and third baseman Russell Branyan all became free agents following the end of the 2008 season; Kapler and Branyan signed one-year contracts with the Tampa Bay Rays and the Seattle Mariners respectively, while Durham remains unsigned . Center fielder Mike Cameron's $10 million contract option for 2009 was exercised by the Brewers. Utility infielder Craig Counsell's $3.4 million contract option was declined by the Brewers, making him a free agent, but the team later agreed to terms on a new one-year, $1 million contract in late January.

Coaching staff
Having made the move of firing manager Ned Yost with only 12 games remaining in the 2008 season, an early priority for the Brewers was the hiring of a permanent replacement for Yost. Candidates considered included interim manager Dale Sveum, former Oakland Athletics manager Ken Macha, former New York Mets manager Willie Randolph, and broadcaster and former Arizona Diamondbacks manager Bob Brenly. On October 30, 2008, the Brewers announced the hiring of Macha, who received a two-year contract to manage the club. In an unusual move, Macha proceeded to hire two of his competitors for his coaching staff, naming Randolph the bench coach and Sveum the hitting coach. Although the Brewers offered pitching coach Mike Maddux a new contract, they were unable to match the offer made by the Texas Rangers. Bullpen coach Bill Castro was promoted to pitching coach, while Nashville Sounds pitching coach Stan Kyles was promoted to fill the vacated bullpen coach position. Brad Fischer was hired as third base coach to round out Macha's new staff.

Spring training
The Brewers opened spring training camp on February 13, with the first game played on February 25. Home games were played at Maryvale Baseball Park in Phoenix, Arizona. The Brewers compiled a 22–10–3 record in spring training games, the best record of any National League team and the second-best record (behind the Los Angeles Angels of Anaheim) in the Cactus League.

The 2009 spring training season was affected by the 2009 World Baseball Classic, which was held in March. Six players in the Brewers system played in the Classic and missed time during spring training: left fielder Ryan Braun (Team USA), relief pitcher Mark DiFelice (Team Italy), and minor league players Vinny Rottino (Team Italy), Adam Stern (Team Canada), Brett Lawrie (Team Canada), and David Welch (Team Australia). Additionally, the Brewers played an exhibition game against Team Australia, winning by the score of 10 to 5.

With the lineup and starting rotation largely set, the main position battles entering camp were for spots in the bullpen and on the bench. Ultimately, the available bench spots were claimed by infielder Casey McGehee, who had been claimed off waivers from the Chicago Cubs during the offseason, center fielder Chris Duffy, who was invited to camp as a non-roster invitee, and outfielder Brad Nelson, the Brewers' fourth-round draft pick in 2001. Mike Lamb, who had been expected to make the club before McGehee's strong spring, was released by the team on April 1; he was eventually signed to a minor league deal by the New York Mets. Closer Trevor Hoffman suffered an oblique strain in mid-March and was forced to begin the regular season on the disabled list.

Regular season

April
The Brewers opened the regular season on the road on April 7 with a loss against the San Francisco Giants; Jeff Suppan made his first Opening Day start for the Brewers and fourth overall.
The Brewers won their home opener three days later with a ninth inning rally over the rival Chicago Cubs. Overall, however, the team struggled during the first few weeks of the season, losing four consecutive series against the Giants, the Cubs, the Cincinnati Reds, and the New York Mets. The Brewers' pitching staff struggled early, compiling a 5.19 ERA during the first four series. Manny Parra, the number three starter in the rotation, particularly struggled and finished the month with an 0–4 record with a 6.52 ERA, and Suppan went 1–2 with a 5.88 ERA. The team's fortunes improved considerably after an 11–4 loss to the Philadelphia Phillies on April 21, however, as the Brewers won series against the Phillies and the Houston Astros before returning home and sweeping the Pittsburgh Pirates to close the month, rallying to a 12–10 overall record in April.

Leading the offense during the month of April was Mike Cameron, who led the team with a .333 batting average and tied for the team lead in home runs with 5. Ryan Braun and Rickie Weeks also hit 5 home runs in April. The month's best starting pitcher was newly acquired Braden Looper, who went 2–0 with a 2.45 ERA in April. Dave Bush came within five outs of a no-hitter in a 6–1 win over Philadelphia on April 23.

Trevor Hoffman returned from the disabled list and made his first Brewers appearance on April 27 in a non-save situation; he recorded his first save with the Brewers (and 555th overall) the following day. Backup catcher Mike Rivera, however, suffered a sprained ankle in the same game and was placed on the disabled list; rookie Carlos Corporán was called up from Nashville to replace him.

May
The Brewers opened May with a split of a four-game series against the Arizona Diamondbacks before sweeping the Pirates in a two-game series in Pittsburgh. In sweeping the Pirates, the Brewers extended their winning streak against Pittsburgh to 17 games dating back to May 20, 2008, the longest winning streak by one Major League Baseball team over another since 1970. The Brewers continued their winning ways in the following five series as well, splitting series against the Reds and Cubs, sweeping the Florida Marlins and the St. Louis Cardinals, and winning two out of three games in Houston. In a one-month period between April 21 and May 21, the Brewers did not lose a series and went 22–6, the best record in baseball over that period. The team struggled at the start of interleague play, however, as the Brewers were swept in their last scheduled visit to the Hubert H. Humphrey Metrodome by the rival Minnesota Twins. Returning home, the Brewers won a Memorial Day matinee against the Cardinals in a game where both Yovani Gallardo took a no-hit bid into the sixth inning and Cardinals starter Chris Carpenter had a perfect game into the seventh inning, but lost the next two games, leaving the Cardinals in sole possession of first place in the NL Central. The Brewers finished the month of May with a sweep of Cincinnati, giving the team an 18–10 record for the month.

Injuries and ineffective play by several bench players caused the Brewers to make several roster moves during the month of May. Mike Rivera returned from the disabled list on May 14 as Carlos Corporán was returned to the minors; Corporan appeared in only one game, where he caught the last two innings of a 15–3 blowout of the Cincinnati Reds on May 6 and singled off of regular Cincinnati shortstop Paul Janish in his only at-bat. The team suffered a significant setback on May 18 when starting second baseman Rickie Weeks suffered an injury to his left wrist, ending his 2009 season. For the time being, Craig Counsell and Casey McGehee are expected to replace Weeks in the lineup; Hernán Iribarren was called up from Nashville following the injury, but was returned to Nashville after only one series. Brad Nelson, who went hitless in 21 at-bats, declined a demotion to the minor leagues and became a free agent on May 15; top third base prospect Mat Gamel was called up to replace Nelson on the roster. On May 21, the Brewers traded Triple-A outfielder Tony Gwynn Jr. to the San Diego Padres in exchange for outfielder Jody Gerut; Chris Duffy was demoted to Nashville to make room on the roster for Gerut. Finally, on May 21 the team called up outfielder Frank Catalanotto, who had been signed to a minor league contract by the team earlier in the month.

June
The Brewers opened June on a sour note, dropping three out of four games to the Florida Marlins at Land Shark Stadium, but rebounded in the next series and won two out of three against the Atlanta Braves. Following a poor outing on June 1 in which he failed to retire any of the six batters he faced, Jorge Julio was released; Mike Burns was called up to take Julio's spot in the bullpen. In 15 appearances for the Brewers, Julio went 1–1 with a 7.79 ERA in  innings. The Brewers returned to Miller Park on June 9 but suffered a 1–5 homestand in which the team was swept by Colorado and lost two out of three against the Chicago White Sox. After giving up 6 runs in  innings in the second game of the White Sox series, Manny Parra was demoted to Triple-A Nashville; in 13 appearances through June 13, Parra went 3–8 with a 7.52 ERA.  In the third game of the series, Trevor Hoffman finally gave up his first run of the season in what was then a tie game; Hoffman had pitched  innings in 2009 without giving up a run.

The Brewers returned to interleague play in Cleveland, where they swept the Cleveland Indians in a high-scoring series that included a six-run rally in the eighth inning on June 15, capped by Prince Fielder's first career grand slam, and an 11-inning win on June 17 that mooted a four-run comeback by the Indians in the ninth inning, giving Hoffman his first blown save of the season. The team's interleague woes returned for the remaining two interleague series, however, as the Brewers were swept in Detroit and dropped two of three against the Twins at Miller Park. The Twins series included the first start by a Brewers pitcher not in the opening day rotation, as Mike Burns made his first career start, replacing the injured Dave Bush. Milwaukee's fortunes improved with a return to National League play, as the team closed out June with series wins at home against San Francisco and the New York Mets. On June 27, Seth McClung made his first start of the year as Manny Parra's replacement in the pitching rotation (due to off days, a fifth starter had not been needed since Parra's June 13 demotion). On June 30, Burns collected his first career win in a game which also included Casey McGehee's first career grand slam. The Brewers ended June with a 12–15 record for the month, but nonetheless held a one-game lead over the St. Louis Cardinals for the division lead.

July
After opening July with a 1–0 loss to the Mets, the Brewers traveled to Wrigley Field for the first time in 2009, losing three of four games to the Cubs over the Fourth of July weekend. The team fared little better upon returning to Miller Park, dropping series against the St. Louis Cardinals and the Los Angeles Dodgers. Manny Parra returned to the majors on July 9 and pitched seven shutout innings, but received a no-decision after the Cardinals scored five runs off the Milwaukee bullpen in the eighth inning.

Three Brewers players participated in the 2009 MLB All-Star Game held July 14 in St. Louis, Missouri. Ryan Braun received 4,138,599 votes in fan balloting, the most received by any National League outfielder, and started his second consecutive All-Star Game. Prince Fielder also made his second All-Star appearance when he was selected as a reserve player by National League team manager Charlie Manuel. Fielder was also invited to the 2009 Home Run Derby, which he ultimately won with 17 home runs in the first two rounds and six home runs in the final round, beating Nelson Cruz of the Texas Rangers. Finally, Trevor Hoffman made his seventh All-Star appearance as a replacement for injured Dodgers closer Jonathan Broxton.

Following the All-Star Break the Brewers went on the road, splitting a four-game series against the Cincinnati Reds before losing two of three against the Pittsburgh Pirates. The Pirates win on July 20 snapped the Brewers 17-game winning streak against Pittsburgh in a game marred by a disputed beanball thrown at Pirates pitcher Jeff Karstens, reportedly in retribution for an incident in April where Karstens hit Ryan Braun with a pitch, that caused both benches to empty during the eighth inning. On July 19, second baseman Felipe López was acquired from the Arizona Diamondbacks for minor league players Cole Gillespie and Roque Mercedes; the acquisition of Lopez was expected to fill the hole at second and at the top of the lineup left by Rickie Weeks' May injury.

Milwaukee's July struggles continued at home, as the team lost a series against Atlanta before splitting a four-game series against the Washington Nationals, who entered the series with a Major League-worst 30–68 record. Tim Dillard was called up from the minor leagues to replace the struggling Mike Burns, and Carlos Villanueva made his first start of the season in a July 28 loss to the Nationals. Villanueva was a somewhat surprising choice for the assignment; though he had starting experience in 2008, Villanueva had struggled out of the bullpen in 2009 with a 2–7 record and 6.19 ERA. Following the series against the Nationals, the Brewers were forced to make more roster moves as Jeff Suppan was placed on the disabled list with a strained left oblique and third baseman Bill Hall was optioned to Triple-A Nashville at his own request to work on his hitting; Hall had struggled with a .201 batting average in 199 at-bats in 2009. Shortly before the July 31 trading deadline, former Brewer Claudio Vargas was acquired from the Los Angeles Dodgers in return for minor league infielder Vinny Rottino in an attempt to shore up the pitching staff.

Season standings

Record vs. opponents

Game log

|- align="center" bgcolor="ffbbbb"
| 1 || April 7 || @ Giants || 10–6 || Martinez (1–0) || Suppan (0–1) || || 42,767 || 0–1
|- align="center" bgcolor="bbffbb"
| 2 || April 8 || @ Giants || 4–2 || Gallardo (1–0) || Johnson (0–1) || Villanueva (1) || 40,764 || 1–1
|- align="center" bgcolor="ffbbbb"
| 3 || April 9 || @ Giants || 7–1 || Cain (1–0) || Parra (0–1) || || 30,027 || 1–2
|- align="center" bgcolor="bbffbb"
| 4 || April 10 || Cubs || 4–3 || Villanueva (1–0) || Gregg (0–1) || || 45,455 || 2–2
|- align="center" bgcolor="ffbbbb"
| 5 || April 11 || Cubs || 6–5 || Heilman (1–0) || Villanueva (1–1) || Mármol (1) || 43,768 || 2–3
|- align="center" bgcolor="ffbbbb"
| 6 || April 12 || Cubs || 8–5 || Dempster (1–0) || Suppan (0–2) || || 40,168 || 2–4
|- align="center" bgcolor="ffbbbb"
| 7 || April 13 || Reds || 7–6 || Vólquez (1–1) || Gallardo (1–1) || Cordero (2) || 25,016 || 2–5
|- align="center" bgcolor="ffbbbb"
| 8 || April 14 || Reds || 6–1 || Arroyo (2–0) || Parra (0–2) || || 27,441 || 2–6
|- align="center" bgcolor="bbffbb"
| 9 || April 15 || Reds || 9–3 || Looper (1–0) || Owings (0–1) || || 30,349 || 3–6
|- align="center" bgcolor="ffbbbb"
| 10 || April 17 || @ Mets || 5–4 || Putz (1–0) || McClung (0–1) || || 36,436 || 3–7
|- align="center" bgcolor="ffbbbb"
| 11 || April 18 || @ Mets || 1–0 || Santana (2–1) || Villanueva (1–2) || Rodríguez (3) || 36,312 || 3–8
|- align="center" bgcolor="bbffbb"
| 12 || April 19 || @ Mets || 4–2 || Suppan (1–2) || Figueroa (0–1) || Coffey (1) || 36,124 || 4–8
|- align="center" bgcolor="ffbbbb"
| 13 || April 21 || @ Phillies || 11–4 || Moyer (2–1) || Parra (0–3) || || 40,605 || 4–9
|- align="center" bgcolor="bbffbb"
| 14 || April 22 || @ Phillies || 3–1 || Looper (2–0) || Blanton (0–2) || Coffey (2) || 32,759 || 5–9
|- align="center" bgcolor="bbffbb"
| 15 || April 23 || @ Phillies || 6–1 || Bush (1–0) || Hamels (0–2) || || 36,395 || 6–9
|- align="center" bgcolor="bbffbb"
| 16 || April 24 || @ Astros || 5–2 || Gallardo (2–1) || Paulino (0–1) || || 25,316 || 7–9
|- align="center" bgcolor="bbffbb"
| 17 || April 25 || @ Astros || 9–8 (11) || DiFelice (1–0) || Geary (0–3) || || 31,355 || 8–9
|- align="center" bgcolor="ffbbbb"
| 18 || April 26 || @ Astros || 3–2 || Ortiz (2–0) || Parra (0–4) || Valverde (2) || 27,690 || 8–10
|- align="center" bgcolor="bbffbb"
| 19 || April 27 || Pirates || 10–5 || Coffey (1–0) || Yates (0–1) || || 32,198 || 9–10
|- align="center" bgcolor="bbffbb"
| 20 || April 28 || Pirates || 6–5 || Julio (1–0) || Chavez (0–1) || Hoffman (1) || 26,594 || 10–10
|- align="center" bgcolor="bbffbb"
| 21 || April 29 || Pirates || 1–0 || Gallardo (3–1) || Snell (1–3) || Villanueva (2) || 29,791 || 11–10
|- align="center" bgcolor="bbffbb"
| 22 || April 30 || Diamondbacks || 4–1 || DiFelice (2–0) || Gordon (0–1) || Hoffman (2) || 26,464 || 12–10

|- align="center" bgcolor="ffbbbb"
| 23 || May 1 || Diamondbacks || 5–2 || Peña (3–0) || Villanueva (1–3) || Qualls (5) || 42,810 || 12–11
|- align="center" bgcolor="ffbbbb"
| 24 || May 2 || Diamondbacks || 4–1 || Haren (3–3) || Looper (2–1) || Qualls (6) || 42,422 || 12–12
|- align="center" bgcolor="bbffbb"
| 25 || May 3 || Diamondbacks || 4–3 || Stetter (1–0) || Gutiérrez (1–2) || Hoffman (3) || 44,727 || 13–12
|- align="center" bgcolor="bbffbb"
| 26 || May 4 || @ Pirates || 7–4 || DiFelice (3–0) || Capps (0–2) || Hoffman (4) || 8,482 || 14–12
|- align="center" bgcolor="bbffbb"
| 27 || May 5 || @ Pirates || 8–5 || Suppan (2–2) || Snell (1–4) || Villanueva (3) || 9,775 || 15–12
|- align="center" bgcolor="bbffbb"
| 28 || May 6 || @ Reds || 15–3 || Parra (1–4) || Arroyo (4–2) || || 10,982 || 16–12
|- align="center" bgcolor="ffbbbb"
| 29 || May 7 || @ Reds || 6–5 || Owings (2–3) || Looper (2–2) || Cordero (8) || 14,724 || 16–13
|- align="center" bgcolor="bbffbb"
| 30 || May 8 || Cubs || 3–2 || Stetter (2–0) || Heilman (2–2) || Hoffman (5) || 42,025 || 17–13
|- align="center" bgcolor="bbffbb"
| 31 || May 9 || Cubs || 12–6 || Gallardo (4–1) || Dempster (2–2) || || 44,428 || 18–13
|- align="center" bgcolor="ffbbbb"
| 32 || May 10 || Cubs || 4–2 || Marshall (1–2) || Suppan (2–3) || Gregg (6) || 41,646 || 18–14
|- align="center" bgcolor="bbffbb"
| 33 || May 12 || Marlins || 6–3 || Parra (2–4) || Koronka (0–1) || Hoffman (6) || 29,331 || 19–14
|- align="center" bgcolor="bbffbb"
| 34 || May 13 || Marlins || 8–6 || Looper (3–2) || Nolasco (2–4) || Hoffman (7) || 32,825 || 20–14
|- align="center" bgcolor="bbffbb"
| 35 || May 14 || Marlins || 5–3 || Bush (2–0) || Badenhop (2–2) || Hoffman (8) || 35,658 || 21–14
|- align="center" bgcolor="bbbbbb"
| || May 15  || @ Cardinals || colspan=6 |Postponed (rain) Rescheduled for May 18
|- align="center" bgcolor="bbffbb"
| 36 || May 16 || @ Cardinals || 1–0 || Suppan (3–3) || Wainwright (3–2) || Hoffman (9) || 43,382 || 22–14
|- align="center" bgcolor="bbffbb"
| 37 || May 17 || @ Cardinals || 8–2 || Parra (3–4) || Wellemeyer (3–4) || || 43,042 || 23–14
|- align="center" bgcolor="bbffbb"
| 38 || May 18 || @ Cardinals || 8–4 || Looper (4–2) || Lohse (3–3) || || 39,136 || 24–14
|- align="center" bgcolor="bbffbb"
| 39 || May 19 || @ Astros || 4–2 || Bush (3–0) || Ortiz (2–2) || Hoffman (10) || 29,343 || 25–14
|- align="center" bgcolor="ffbbbb"
| 40 || May 20 || @ Astros || 6–4 || Rodríguez (5–2) || Gallardo (4–2) || Sampson (2) || 27,160 || 25–15
|- align="center" bgcolor="bbffbb"
| 41 || May 21 || @ Astros || 4–3 || McClung (1–1) || Fulchino (0–1) || Hoffman (11) || 25,037 || 26–15
|- align="center" bgcolor="ffbbbb"
| 42 || May 22 || @ Twins || 11–3 || Slowey (6–1) || Parra (3–5) || || 30,297 || 26–16
|- align="center" bgcolor="ffbbbb"
| 43 || May 23 || @ Twins || 6–2 || Swarzak (1–0) || Looper (4–3) || || 40,547 || 26–17
|- align="center" bgcolor="ffbbbb"
| 44 || May 24 || @ Twins || 6–3 || Baker (2–5) || Bush (3–1) || || 38,959 || 26–18
|- align="center" bgcolor="bbffbb"
| 45 || May 25 || Cardinals || 1–0 (10) || Villanueva (2–3) || McClellan (2–2) || || 43,032 || 27–18
|- align="center" bgcolor="ffbbbb"
| 46 || May 26 || Cardinals || 8–1 || Wainwright (5–2) || Suppan (3–4) || || 37,404 || 27–19
|- align="center" bgcolor="ffbbbb"
| 47 || May 27 || Cardinals || 3–2 || Wellemeyer (5–4) || Parra (3–6) || Franklin (12) || 40,226 || 27–20
|- align="center" bgcolor="bbffbb"
| 48 || May 29 || Reds || 3–2 || Looper (5–3) || Cueto (4–3) || Hoffman (12) || 42,186 || 28–20
|- align="center" bgcolor="bbffbb"
| 49 || May 30 || Reds || 9–5 || McClung (2–1) || Harang (5–5) || || 44,172 || 29–20
|- align="center" bgcolor="bbffbb"
| 50 || May 31 || Reds || 5–2 || Gallardo (5–2) || Owings (3–6) || Hoffman (13) || 44,594 || 30–20

|- align="center" bgcolor="ffbbbb"
| 51 || June 1 || @ Marlins || 7–4 || Martínez (1–0) || Julio (1–1) || Lindstrom (10) || 10,509 || 30–21
|- align="center" bgcolor="ffbbbb"
| 52 || June 2 || @ Marlins || 10–3 || Badenhop (4–2) || Parra (3–7) || || 10,831 || 30–22
|- align="center" bgcolor="bbffbb"
| 53 || June 3 || @ Marlins || 9–6 || McClung (3–1) || West (0–1) || Hoffman (14) || 13,012 || 31–22
|- align="center" bgcolor="ffbbbb"
| 54 || June 4 || @ Marlins || 4–3 || Johnson (5–1) || Bush (3–2) || Lindstrom (11) || 11,623 || 31–23
|- align="center" bgcolor="bbffbb"
| 55 || June 5 || @ Braves || 4–0 || Gallardo (6–2) || Jurrjens (5–3) || || 23,327 || 32–23
|- align="center" bgcolor="bbffbb"
| 56 || June 6 || @ Braves || 3–0 || Suppan (4–4) || Vázquez (4–5) || Hoffman (15) || 32,721 || 33–23
|- align="center" bgcolor="ffbbbb"
| 57 || June 7 || @ Braves || 8–7 || O'Flaherty (1–0) || Villanueva (2–4) || González (8) || 33,428 || 33–24
|- align="center" bgcolor="ffbbbb"
| 58 || June 9 || Rockies || 3–2 || Hammel (3–3) || Coffey (1–1) || Street (10) || 32,464 || 33–25
|- align="center" bgcolor="ffbbbb"
| 59 || June 10 || Rockies || 4–2 || de la Rosa (2–6) || Bush (3–3) || Street (11) || 34,823 || 33–26
|- align="center" bgcolor="ffbbbb"
| 60 || June 11 || Rockies || 5–4 || Cook (5–3) || Gallardo (6–3) || Street (12) || 35,467 || 33–27
|- align="center" bgcolor="bbffbb"
| 61 || June 12 || White Sox || 7–2 || Suppan (5–4) || Dotel (1–2) || || 41,811 || 34–27
|- align="center" bgcolor="ffbbbb"
| 62 || June 13 || White Sox || 7–1 || Contreras (2–5) || Parra (3–8) || || 44,100 || 34–28
|- align="center" bgcolor="ffbbbb"
| 63 || June 14 || White Sox || 5–4 || Thornton (4–1) || Hoffman (0–1) || Jenks (14) || 41,586 || 34–29
|- align="center" bgcolor="bbffbb"
| 64 || June 15 || @ Indians || 14–12 || Coffey (2–1) || Pérez (1–2) || Hoffman (16) || 25,415 || 35–29
|- align="center" bgcolor="bbffbb"
| 65 || June 16 || @ Indians || 7–5 || Gallardo (7–3) || Sowers (1–4) || || 22,986 || 36–29
|- align="center" bgcolor="bbffbb"
| 66 || June 17 || @ Indians || 9–8 (11) || DiFelice (4–0) || Aquino (1–2) || Stetter (1) || 15,269 || 37–29
|- align="center" bgcolor="ffbbbb"
| 67 || June 19 || @ Tigers || 4–10 (7) || Miner (4–1) || Looper (5–4) || || 34,112 || 37–30
|- align="center" bgcolor="ffbbbb"
| 68 || June 20 || @ Tigers || 5–9 || Figaro (1–0) || Bush (3–4) || || 39,156 || 37–31
|- align="center" bgcolor="ffbbbb"
| 69 || June 21 || @ Tigers || 2–3  || Verlander (8–3)  || Gallardo (7–4) || Rodney (14) || 41,163 || 37–32
|- align="center" bgcolor="ffbbbb"
| 70 || June 23 || Twins || 7–3  || Liriano (3–8) || Suppan (5–5) || || 42,008 || 37–33
|- align="center" bgcolor="bbffbb"
| 71 || June 24 || Twins || 4–3 || Coffey (3–1) || Blackburn (6–3) || Hoffman (17) || 34,480 || 38–33
|- align="center" bgcolor="ffbbbb"
| 72 || June 25 || Twins || 6–4 || Baker (5–6) || Burns (0–1) || Nathan (17) || 40,524 || 38–34
|- align="center" bgcolor="bbffbb"
| 73 || June 26 || Giants || 5–1 || Gallardo (8–4) || Cain (9–2) || || 37,345 || 39–34
|- align="center" bgcolor="bbffbb"
| 74 || June 27 || Giants || 7–6 || Hoffman (1–1) || Wilson (2–4) || || 42,065 || 40–34
|- align="center" bgcolor="ffbbbb"
| 75 || June 28 || Giants || 7–0 || Sadowski (1–0) || Suppan (5–6) || || 43,391 || 40–35
|- align="center" bgcolor="bbffbb"
| 76 || June 29 || Mets || 10–6 || Looper (6–4) || Nieve (3–1) || Hoffman (18) || 39,872 || 41–35
|- align="center" bgcolor="bbffbb"
| 77 || June 30 || Mets || 6–3 || Burns (1–1) || Santana (9–6) || || 39,872 || 42–35

|- align="center" bgcolor="ffbbbb"
| 78 || July 1 || Mets || 1–0 || Pelfrey (6–3) || Gallardo (8–5) || Rodríguez (21) || 35,409 || 42–36
|- align="center" bgcolor="ffbbbb"
| 79 || July 2 || @ Cubs || 9–5 || Dempster (5–5) || McClung (3–2) || || 40,545 || 42–37
|- align="center" bgcolor="ffbbbb"
| 80 || July 3 || @ Cubs || 2–1 || Gregg (3–2) || DiFelice (4–1) || || 41,204 || 42–38
|- align="center" bgcolor="bbffbb"
| 81 || July 4 || @ Cubs || 11–2 || Looper (7–4) || Harden (5–5) || || 40,088 || 43–38
|- align="center" bgcolor="ffbbbb"
| 82 || July 5 || @ Cubs || 8–2 || Lilly (8–6) || Burns (1–2) || || 40,369 || 43–39
|- align="center" bgcolor="ffbbbb"
| 83 || July 7 || Cardinals || 5–0 || Wainwright (9–5) || Gallardo (8–6) || || 36,557 || 43–40
|- align="center" bgcolor="bbffbb"
| 84 || July 8 || Cardinals || 5–4 || Coffey (4–1) || Motte (3–3) || Hoffman (19) || 33,655 || 44–40
|- align="center" bgcolor="ffbbbb"
| 85 || July 9 || Cardinals || 5–1 || Piñeiro (7–9) || Villanueva (2–5) || || 40,357 || 44–41
|- align="center" bgcolor="ffbbbb"
| 86 || July 10 || Dodgers || 12–8 || Troncoso (3–0) || Villanueva (2–6) || || 41,811 || 44–42
|- align="center" bgcolor="bbffbb"
| 87 || July 11 || Dodgers || 6–3 || Burns (2–2) || Weaver (5–3) || Hoffman (20) || 43,466 || 45–42
|- align="center" bgcolor="ffbbbb"
| 88 || July 12 || Dodgers || 7–4 || Kershaw (7–5) || Gallardo (8–7) || Troncoso (5) || 42,241 || 45–43
|- align="center" bgcolor="bbffbb"
| 89 || July 16 || @ Reds || 9–6 || Looper (8–4) || Bailey (1–1) || Hoffman (21) || 23,579 || 46–43
|- align="center" bgcolor="ffbbbb"
| 90 || July 17 || @ Reds || 4–0 || Arroyo (10–8) || Suppan (5–7) || || 25,687 || 46–44
|- align="center" bgcolor="bbffbb"
| 91 || July 18 || @ Reds || 5–1 || Parra (4–8) || Harang (5–10) || || 40,524 || 47–44
|- align="center" bgcolor="ffbbbb"
| 92 || July 19 || @ Reds || 5–3 || Weathers (2–2) || McClung (3–3) || Cordero (22) || 25,924 || 47–45
|- align="center" bgcolor="ffbbbb"
| 93 || July 20 || @ Pirates || 8–5 || Ohlendorf (8–7) || Burns (2–3) || || 11,471 || 47–46
|- align="center" bgcolor="bbffbb"
| 94 || July 21 || @ Pirates || 2–0 || Looper (9–4) || Vasquez (1–4) || Hoffman (22) || 16,184 || 48–46
|- align="center" bgcolor="ffbbbb"
| 95 || July 22 || @ Pirates || 8–7 || Capps (2–5) || Stetter (2–1) || || 21,186 || 48–47
|- align="center" bgcolor="ffbbbb"
| 96 || July 24 || Braves || 9–4 || Vázquez (8–7) || Villanueva (2–7) || || 41,491 || 48–48
|- align="center" bgcolor="bbffbb"
| 97 || July 25 || Braves || 4–0 || Gallardo (9–7) || Hanson (5–1) || || 43,565 || 49–48
|- align="center" bgcolor="ffbbbb"
| 98 || July 26 || Braves || 10–2 || Lowe (10–7) || Looper (9–5) || || 43,471 || 49–49
|- align="center" bgcolor="ffbbbb"
| 99 || July 27 || Nationals || 14–6 || Bergmann (1–1) || Suppan (5–8) || || 37,311 || 49–50
|- align="center" bgcolor="ffbbbb"
| 100 || July 28 || Nationals || 8–3  || Balester (1–1) || Villanueva (2–8) || || 36,502 || 49–51
|- align="center" bgcolor="bbffbb"
| 101 || July 29 || Nationals || 7–5 || Parra (5–8) || Clippard (1–1) || Hoffman (23) || 32,992 || 50–51
|- align="center" bgcolor="bbffbb"
| 102 || July 30 || Nationals || 7–3 || Gallardo (10–7) || Martin (0–2) || || 39,890 || 51–51
|- align="center" bgcolor="ffbbbb"
| 103 || July 31 || @ Padres || 11–7 || Mujica (3–4) || Dillard (0–1) || || 32,588 || 51–52

|- align="center" bgcolor="ffbbbb"
| 104 || August 1 || @ Padres || 4–2 || Burke (3–3) || Burns (2–4) || Bell (26) || 26,424 || 51–53
|- align="center" bgcolor="bbffbb"
| 105 || August 2 || @ Padres || 6–1 || Stetter (3–3) || Correia (7–9) || || 23,696 || 52–53
|- align="center" bgcolor="bbffbb"
| 106 || August 3 || @ Dodgers || 6–5 || Parra (6–8) || Kershaw (8–6) || Hoffman (24) || 46,544 || 53–53
|- align="center" bgcolor="ffbbbb"
| 107 || August 4 || @ Dodgers || 17–4 || Kuroda (4–5) || Gallardo (10–8) || || 45,535 || 53–54
|- align="center" bgcolor="bbffbb"
| 108 || August 5 || @ Dodgers || 4–1 || Looper (10–5) || Schmidt (2–2) || Hoffman (25) || 50,276 || 54–54
|- align="center" bgcolor="ffbbbb"
| 109 || August 7 || @ Astros || 6–3 || Norris (2–0) || Villanueva (2–9) || Valverde (14) || 34,691 || 54–55
|- align="center" bgcolor="bbffbb"
| 110 || August 8 || @ Astros || 12–5 || Parra (7–8) || Hampton (7–9) || || 35,216 || 55–55
|- align="center" bgcolor="ffbbbb"
| 111 || August 9 || @ Astros || 2–0 || Rodríguez (11–6) || Gallardo (10–9) || Valverde (15) || 32,262 || 55–56
|- align="center" bgcolor="ffbbbb"
| 112 || August 11 || Padres || 13–6 || Richard (6–3) || Looper (10–6) || || 37,040 || 55–57
|- align="center" bgcolor="ffbbbb"
| 113 || August 12 || Padres || 6–5 || Correia (8–9) || Coffey (4–2) || Bell (29) || 38,753 || 55–58
|- align="center" bgcolor="bbffbb"
| 114 || August 13 || Padres || 12–9 || Parra (8–8) || Carrillo (0–1) || Hoffman (26) || 39,683 || 56–58
|- align="center" bgcolor="bbffbb"
| 115 || August 14 || Astros || 11–2 || Gallardo (11–9) || Rodríguez (11–7) || || 37,715 || 57–58
|- align="center" bgcolor="bbffbb"
| 116 || August 15 || Astros || 6–2 || Burns (3–4) || Moehler (7–9) || || 42,952 || 58–58
|- align="center" bgcolor="ffbbbb"
| 117 || August 16 || Astros || 8–5 || Fulchino (5–4) || Weathers (3–4) || Valverde (16) || 41,863 || 58–59
|- align="center" bgcolor="ffbbbb"
| 118 || August 17 || @ Pirates || 9–5 || Hart (4–2) || Villanueva (2–10) || || 12,478 || 58–60
|- align="center" bgcolor="ffbbbb"
| 119 || August 18 || @ Pirates || 5–2 || Ohlendorf (11–8) || Parra (8–9) || || 12,188 || 58–61
|- align="center" bgcolor="ffbbbb"
| 120 || August 19 || @ Pirates || 3–1 || Maholm (7–7) || Gallardo (11–10) || Capps (22) || 12,630 || 58–62
|- align="center" bgcolor="bbffbb"
| 121 || August 21 || @ Nationals || 7–3 || Looper (11–6) || Martin (2–3) || || 26,307 || 59–62
|- align="center" bgcolor="bbffbb"
| 122 || August 22 || @ Nationals || 11–9 || Narveson (1–0) || Bergmann (2–2) || Hoffman (27) || 19,374 || 60–62
|- align="center" bgcolor="ffbbbb"
| 123 || August 23 || @ Nationals || 8–3 || Stammen (4–6) || Parra (8–10) || || 21,484 || 60–63
|- align="center" bgcolor="bbffbb"
| 124 || August 24 || @ Nationals || 7–1 || Gallardo (12–10) || Balester (1–4) || || 17,805 || 61–63
|- align="center" bgcolor="ffbbbb"
| 125 || August 25 || Reds || 8–6 || Herrera (2–4) || Coffey (4–3) || || 29,481 || 61–64
|- align="center" bgcolor="ffbbbb"
| 126 || August 26 || Reds || 4–3 || Herrera (3–4) || Burns (3–5) || Cordero (27) || 35,084 || 61–65
|- align="center" bgcolor="ffbbbb"
| 127 || August 27 || Reds || 8–5 || Lehr (3–1) || Bush (3–5) || Cordero (28) || 31,091 || 61–66
|- align="center" bgcolor="bbffbb"
| 128 || August 28 || Pirates || 8–6 || Parra (9–10) || Duke (10–12) || Hoffman (28) || 34,438 || 62–66
|- align="center" bgcolor="bbffbb"
| 129 || August 29 || Pirates || 7–3 || Vargas (1–0) || Hart (4–4) || || 41,773 || 63–66
|- align="center" bgcolor="bbffbb"
| 130 || August 30 || Pirates || 4–1 || Suppan (6–8) || Ohlendorf (11–9) || Hoffman (29) || 41,157 || 64–66

|- align="center" bgcolor="ffbbbb"
| 131 || September 1 || @ Cardinals ||  7–6 || Piñeiro (14–9) || Weathers (3–5) || Franklin (36) || 40,119 || 64–67
|- align="center" bgcolor="ffbbbb"
| 132 || September 2 || @ Cardinals ||  10–3 || Carpenter (15–3)  || Bush (3–6)  || || 40,214 || 64–68
|- align="center" bgcolor="bbffbb"
| 133 || September 3 || @ Cardinals || 4–3 || Parra (10–10) || Smoltz (1–1) || Hoffman (30) || 37,791 || 65–68
|- align="center" bgcolor="ffbbbb"
| 134 || September 4 || Giants || 3–2 || Medders (4–1) || Coffey (4–4) || Wilson (33) || 37,511 || 65–69
|- align="center" bgcolor="ffbbbb"
| 135 || September 5 || Giants || 3–2 || Cain (13–4) || Gallardo (12–11) || Wilson (34) || 30,254 || 65–70
|- align="center" bgcolor="bbffbb"
| 136 || September 6 || Giants || 2–1 (12) || Stetter (4–1) || Valdez (2–1) || || 36,590 || 66–70
|- align="center" bgcolor="ffbbbb"
| 137 || September 7 || Cardinals || 3–0 || Carpenter (16–3) || Bush (3–7) || || 35,360 || 66–71
|- align="center" bgcolor="ffbbbb"
| 138 || September 8 || Cardinals || 3–4 || Hawksworth (3–0) || Hoffman (1–2) || McClellan (3) || 36,172 || 66–72
|- align="center" bgcolor="ffbbbb"
| 139 || September 9 || Cardinals || 5–1 || Wainwright (18–7) || Suppan (6–9) || || 26,559 || 66–73
|- align="center" bgcolor="bbffbb"
| 140 || September 11 || @ Diamondbacks || 6–3 || Looper (12–6) || Davis (7–13) || Hoffman (31) || 19,945 || 67–73
|- align="center" bgcolor="bbffbb"
| 141 || September 12 || @ Diamondbacks || 9–2 || Bush (4–7) || Mulvey (0–1) || || 31,369 || 68–73
|- align="center" bgcolor="bbffbb"
| 142 || September 13 || @ Diamondbacks || 5–3 || Villanueva (3–10) || Schlereth (0–4) || Hoffman (32) || 21,453 || 69–73
|- align="center" bgcolor="ffbbbb"
| 143 || September 14 || @ Cubs || 2–0 || Dempster (10–8) || Suppan (6–10) || Mármol (13) || 38,725 || 69–74
|- align="center" bgcolor="ffbbbb"
| 144 || September 15 || @ Cubs || 13–7 || Heilman (3–3) || Gallardo (12–12) || || 38,986 || 69–75
|- align="center" bgcolor="bbffbb"
| 145 || September 16 || @ Cubs || 9–5 || Looper (13–6) || Harden (9–9) || || 38,084 || 70–75
|- align="center" bgcolor="bbffbb"
| 146 || September 17 || @ Cubs || 7–4 || Bush (5–7) || Wells (10–9) || Hoffman (33) || 39,158 || 71–75
|- align="center" bgcolor="bbffbb"
| 147 || September 18 || Astros || 3–2 || Weathers (4–5) || Wright (3–4) || Hoffman (34) || 39,057 || 72–75
|- align="center" bgcolor="bbffbb"
| 148 || September 19 || Astros || 7–2 || Suppan (7–10) || Byrdak (1–2) ||  || 36,399 || 73–75
|- align="center" bgcolor="bbffbb"
| 149 || September 20 || Astros || 6–0 || Gallardo (13–12) || Paulino (2–10) || || 30,024 || 74–75
|- align="center" bgcolor="ffbbbb"
| 150 || September 21 || Cubs || 10–2 || Gorzelanny (6–2) || Looper (13–7) || || 34,192 || 74–76
|- align="center" bgcolor="ffbbbb"
| 151 || September 22 || Cubs || 7–2 || Wells (11–9) || Bush (5–8) || || 34,316 || 74–77
|- align="center" bgcolor="bbffbb"
| 152 || September 23 || Cubs || 3–2 ||  Narveson (2–0) || Samardzija (1–3) || Hoffman (35) || 32,340 || 75–77
|- align="center" bgcolor="ffbbbb"
| 153 || September 24 || Phillies || 9–4 || Happ (11–4) || Suppan (7–11) || || 37,678 || 75–78
|- align="center" bgcolor="bbffbb"
| 154 || September 25 || Phillies || 8–4 || Parra (11–10) || Lee (14–12) || Hoffman (36) || 33,428 || 76–78
|- align="center" bgcolor="bbffbb"
| 155 || September 26 || Phillies || 7–5 || Hoffman (2–2) || Walker (2–1) || || 40,141 || 77–78
|- align="center" bgcolor="ffbbbb"
| 156 || September 27 || Phillies || 6–5 || Blanton (12–7) || Bush (5–9) || Madson (9) || 37,197 || 77–79
|- align="center" bgcolor="ffbbbb"
| 157 || September 29 || @ Rockies || 7–5 (11) || Belisle (3–1) || Weathers (4–6) || || 39,087 || 77–80
|- align="center" bgcolor="ffbbbb"
| 158 || September 30 || @ Rockies || 10–6 || Hammel (10–8) || Suppan (7–12) || || 41,465 || 77–81

|- align="center" bgcolor="ffbbbb"
| 159 || October 1 || @ Rockies || 9–2 || Cook (11–6) || Parra (11–11) || || 38,098 || 77–82
|- align="center" bgcolor="bbffbb"
| 160 || October 2 || @ Cardinals || 12–6 || Looper (14–7) || McClellan (4–4) || || 44,331 || 78–82
|- align="center" bgcolor="bbffbb"
| 161 || October 3 || @ Cardinals || 5–4 || Villanueva (4–10) || Lohse (6–10) || Hoffman (37) || 43,977 || 79–82
|- align="center" bgcolor="bbffbb"
| 162 || October 4 || @ Cardinals || 9–7 (10) || Hoffman (3–2) || Wellemeyer (7–10) || Axford (1) || 43,464 || 80–82

Source:

Roster

Player stats

Batting

Starters by position
Note: Pos = Position; G = Games played; AB = At bats; H = Hits; Avg. = Batting average; HR = Home runs; RBI = Runs batted in

Through October 4, 2009

Other batters
Note: G = Games played; AB = At bats; H = Hits; Avg. = Batting average; HR = Home runs; RBI = Runs batted in

Through October 4, 2009

Pitching

Starting and other pitchers
Note: G = Games pitched; IP = Innings pitched; W = Wins; L = Losses; ERA = Earned run average; SO = Strikeouts; WHIP = Walks + hits per inning pitched

Through October 4, 2009

Relief pitchers
Note: G = Games pitched; W = Wins; L = Losses; SV = Saves; IP = Innings pitched; ERA = Earned run average; SO = Strikeouts; WHIP = Walks + hits per inning pitched

Through October 4, 2009

Farm system

The Brewers' farm system consisted of seven minor league affiliates in 2009. The Brewers operated a Dominican Summer League team as a co-op with the Baltimore Orioles.

References

External links

2009 Milwaukee Brewers season at Baseball Reference
2009 Milwaukee Brewers season Official Site

Milwaukee Brewers seasons
Milwaukee Brewers
Milwaukee Brew